William Lloyd (18 August 162730 August 1717) was an English divine who served successively as bishop of St Asaph, of Lichfield and Coventry and of Worcester.

Life
Lloyd was born at Tilehurst in Berkshire, in 1627, the son of Richard Lloyd, then vicar, who was the son of David Lloyd of Henblas, Anglesey. By the age of eleven, he had understanding in Greek and Latin, and somewhat of Hebrew, before attending Oriel and Jesus Colleges, Oxford (later becoming a Fellow of Jesus College). He graduated with an M.A. in 1646. In 1663 he was prebendary of Ripon, in 1667 prebendary of Salisbury, in 1668 archdeacon of Merioneth, in 1672 dean of Bangor and prebendary of St Paul's, London, in 1680 bishop of St Asaph, in 1689 lord-almoner, in 1692 bishop of Lichfield and Coventry, and in 1699 bishop of Worcester. As Bishop of Lichfield, he rebuilt the diocesan residence at Eccleshall Castle, which had been destroyed in the Civil War.

Lloyd was an indefatigable opponent of the Roman Catholic tendencies of James II of England, and was one of the seven bishops who, for refusing to have the Declaration of Indulgence read in his diocese, was charged with publishing a seditious libel against the king. However, he was acquitted in 1688, which was one of the events that lead to the fall of James II.

He engaged Gilbert Burnet to write The History of the Reformation of the Church of England and provided him with much material. He was a good scholar and a keen student of biblical apocalyptic literature and himself "prophesied" to Anne, Queen of Great Britain, Robert Harley, 1st Earl of Oxford and Mortimer, William Whiston, and John Evelyn the diarist. Lloyd was a staunch supporter of the Glorious Revolution.

He lived to the age of ninety-one and died at Hartlebury Castle on 30 August 1717. He was buried in the church of Fladbury, near Evesham in Worcestershire, of which his son was rector and where a monument is erected to his memory with a long inscription.

Works
His chief publication was An Historical Account of Church Government as it was in Great Britain and Ireland when they first received the Christian Religion (London, 1684, reprinted Oxford, 1842).
He added a revised version of Ussher's chronology to a 1701 edition of the 1611 Authorised Version of the Bible, published in folio, under the direction of archbishop Tenison.

References

1627 births
1717 deaths
Burials in Worcestershire
Bishops of Lichfield
Bishops of St Asaph
Bishops of Worcester
Alumni of Jesus College, Oxford
Fellows of Jesus College, Oxford
People from Tilehurst
17th-century Welsh Anglican bishops
18th-century Church of England bishops
17th-century Anglican theologians
18th-century Anglican theologians